Algebrator (also called Softmath) is a computer algebra system (CAS), which was developed in the late 1990s by Neven Jurkovic of Softmath, San Antonio, Texas. This is a CAS specifically geared towards algebra education. Beside the computation results, it shows step by step the solution process and context sensitive explanations.

See also 
List of computer algebra systems

References

External links 

 

Computer algebra systems
Educational math software